NSND Trà Giang is a Vietnamese actress. She won the award for Best Actress at the 8th Moscow International Film Festival for her role in 17th Parallel, Nights and Days.

Selected filmography
 17th Parallel, Nights and Days (1973)
 Girl from Hanoi (1975)

Awards 
 People's Artist (1984)

References

External links 
 
 

Vietnamese film actresses
People's Artists of Vietnam
Living people
1941 births
20th-century Vietnamese actresses
People from Quảng Ngãi province
21st-century Vietnamese women